The Ottawa Champions Baseball Club were a professional baseball team based in Ottawa, Ontario, Canada. The Champions made their debut as a member of the Canadian American Association of Professional Baseball (Can-Am League) in 2015. 
They won their first league championship in 2016 defeating the Rockland Boulders 3-2 after being down 2-0 in the series, winning game 5, 3-1 with a complete game win by Austin Chrismon.
They played their home games at Raymond Chabot Grant Thornton Park. The Champions mascot was Champ. 

After the 2019 season, the Can-Am League merged with the Frontier League and five of the six teams remaining in it joined the latter league. The Champions were not invited to take part, but it was not immediately clear if they would fold or go on hiatus as owner Miles Wolff, the former Can-Am League commissioner, looked to sell the team. He could not find a buyer, however, and the team folded operations. Eventually, the Frontier League decided to expand to Ottawa anyway, announcing in September 2020 that the league would be granting a franchise to a group led by Sam Katz, the former mayor of Winnipeg and owner of the Winnipeg Goldeyes of the American Association of Independent Professional Baseball, and Ottawa Sports and Entertainment Group, who owns the Ottawa 67’s junior hockey team and the Ottawa Redblacks of the Canadian Football League; the league considers this to be an expansion team and not to have any connection to the Champions. The new team are the Ottawa Titans, which started their season in May 2022 due to the COVID-19 pandemic.

History 

The City of Ottawa granted a 10-year lease of the Ottawa Baseball Stadium to establish a Can-Am Baseball League team for the 2015 season in September 2013.

In June 2014, the Ottawa Champions team name was announced followed by the unveiling of the team logo that August.

The Champions announced the signing of Hal Lanier as the team’s first on-field manager on 18 November 2014. Lanier is a former Major League Baseball player who began his MLB career in 1964 as a member of the San Francisco Giants; he also spent time as a New York Yankee at the end of his playing career. He worked as a coach for the St. Louis Cardinals and won a World Series with them in 1982. He was the manager of the Houston Astros from 1986-1988 and was named the NL Manager of the Year in 1986. He has managed numerous independent league teams before including the Winnipeg Goldeyes and Can-Am team the Sussex Skyhawks. Along with Lanier, the Champions also announced the signing of their first player, Gatineau native OF Sebastien Boucher. Boucher was drafted 213th in the 2004 MLB Draft and was selected to play for Canada in the World Baseball Classic in 2006. The team's founding president is David Gourlay.

The Champions played their first game in franchise history on May 22, 2015 at Raymond Chabot Grant Thornton Park against the Sussex County Miners.

In the 2016 season, the Champions qualified for the playoffs for the first time in franchise history. In the opening round, the Champions defeated the New Jersey Jackals 3 games to 1 and advanced to Can-Am League Championship Round for the very first time in franchise history. In the championship round, the Champions defeated the Rockland Boulders 3 games to 2 to capture their first championship.

On June 28th, 2017, Phillippe Aumont threw the first no-hitter in Ottawa Champions history against the Dominican Republic national baseball team.

After the 2019 season, The Can-Am League merged with the Frontier League. However, the Champions were left off the 2020 Schedule.

Shortly after the Champions were left off the 2020 schedule, Winnipeg Goldeyes owner Sam Katz was attempting to bring either an Atlantic League or a Frontier League franchise to Ottawa by 2021. Then, Katz became the owner of the Ottawa Titans of the Frontier League.

Raymond Chabot Grant Thornton Park renovations 

The Ottawa Champions played their home games at RCGT Park, a 10,000-seat baseball stadium just east of downtown Ottawa. As part of the plans to revitalize baseball in Ottawa, the city and the team invested more than $2 million worth of renovations into the stadium. These renovations included a brand-new video scoreboard.

Along with the stadium renovations, the city built a new pedestrian bridge to help make it easier to get to the ballpark using public transit. The pedestrian bridge crosses over Highway 417 to connect the ballpark to the Transit Way and is named in honour of the late Max Keeping.

Season-by-season records

Logo 

The baseball cap logo is a detailed representation of Ottawa’s traditional landscape with the Peace Tower on Parliament Hill as the focal centrepiece. The Peace Tower is surrounded by a red ‘O’ representing the Ottawa name. The background is filled with a maple leaf, which will proudly display the Champions’ Canadian pedigree as they travel all over North America for regular season games.

The brand logo displays the Champions name in bold and clear lettering allowing for easy recognition throughout the community and the CanAm League. The bottom distinguishes the baseball identity with home plate and white lines indicating the first and third base sides.

See also 
 Ottawa Voyageurs
 Ottawa Lynx, active 1993–2007
 Ottawa Rapidz, active 2008
 Ottawa Fat Cats, active 2010–2012

References

External links
 Ottawa Champions at Can-Am League

Canadian American Association of Professional Baseball teams
Champions
Baseball teams established in 2014
2014 establishments in Ontario